The United States Mint Police (USMP) is a U.S. federal law enforcement agency responsible for the protection of the facilities of the U.S. Mint.  In 2004 they employed 376 police officers.

History

The United States Mint Police was founded in 1792, making it one of the oldest federal law enforcement agencies in the United States.

Official duties

Mint Police Officers are required to successfully pass the Uniform Police Training Program at the Federal Law Enforcement Training Center at either Glynnco, Georgia or Artesia, New Mexico for 13 weeks and complete a 5 weeks field training program. The Mint Police is responsible for protecting over $300 billion in Treasury and other government assets stored in U.S. Mint facilities in Washington, D.C., Philadelphia, Denver, San Francisco, Fort Knox, and West Point. The Mint Police also safeguards over 2,800 U.S. Mint employees. In addition, the United States Mint Police have guarded the U.S. Constitution; the Gettysburg Address; and from World War II to 1978, the Holy Crown of Hungary. Its scope has increased over the years, and it now trains with local law enforcement and has bicycle patrols throughout cities.

In the past, the Mint Police have "participated in security details at a variety of non-Mint-related events, including two presidential inaugurations, the Kentucky Derby, 2002 Winter Olympics in Salt Lake City, and an International Monetary Fund/World Bank Conference." It also assisted with Hurricane Katrina, protecting the New Orleans branch of the Federal Reserve Bank of Atlanta and participating in relief efforts.

Rank Structure

Equipment
As Federal Police officers, USMP officers carry firearms and a variety of police equipment, including batons, handcuffs, radios and oleoresin capsicum.

The USMP uses marked police vehicles in the execution of their duties, notably Fords, Chevrolet Tahoes, with red-and-blue lights, sirens and radio systems.

Locations
USMP police and guard various facilities, including:

Philadelphia, Pa.; 
San Francisco, Calif.; 
West Point, N.Y.; 
Denver, Colo.; 
Fort Knox, Ky.; 
and headquarters in Washington, D.C.

Fallen officer
Since the establishment of the United States Mint Police, one officer has died in the line of duty.

See also

 List of United States federal law enforcement agencies
 Federal Reserve Police
 United States Secret Service

References

1792 establishments in the United States
Mint Police
Police